Andrea Kristen Savage (born February 20, 1973) is an American actress, comedian, and writer known for her roles in projects such as the Comedy Central mockumentary series Dog Bites Man (2006), the comedy film Step Brothers (2008), Hulu's reality TV parody series The Hotwives (2014–2015), and the HBO comedy Veep (2016–2017). She created and starred in TruTV's comedy series I'm Sorry (2017–2019).

Early life and education
Savage was born in Santa Monica, California, the daughter of Sharon Lee and Richard Savage. She is three quarters Ashkenazi Jewish and one quarter Greek descent (her maternal grandfather was of Greek origin). In her senior year of high school, she played Mame in Mame. She graduated from Cornell University with a degree in government and a minor in law studies. She has performed stand-up comedy at The Improv, The Comedy Store, The Ice House and other venues around Los Angeles.

Career
Savage began her acting career playing Renata Vargas, a Brazilian exchange student on Sweet Valley High. Soon after, she joined The Groundlings theater, performing weekly in their company. Savage received starring roles in Significant Others as Chelsea and in Dog Bites Man as Tillie Sullivan. Then, she played the role of Denise in Step Brothers opposite Will Ferrell, following that with a comedy tour with Ferrell, Zach Galifianakis, Demetri Martin, and Nick Swardson. She also appeared with Woody Harrelson in The Grand (2008).

After taking time off to have her child, in 2010, Savage was in the film Dinner For Schmucks. She also filmed two television pilots: The Strip created by Tom Lennon and Ben Garant for NBC, and Wilfred, a dark Australian comedy being redone for FX. In addition, Savage created and starred in a series of shorts for the HBO show Funny or Die Presents about a very pregnant woman trying to engage in some casual sex, as well as a series entitled "Reenactments of Actual Conversations from the Ladies Rooms of Hollywood". She was also seen in the cult hit Party Down for Starz (Savage was originally cast as Casey Klein in the unaired pilot but because she was pregnant, Lizzy Caplan took the role when the show went into production). Soon after, she wrote television pilots for Comedy Central, Fox Studios, and NBC (produced by Jay Roach); as well as the screenplay Girls Weekend for Castle Rock Films. She also filmed opposite Hilary Swank in the film You're Not You. Her directorial debut was in 2012 when she shot her satirical PSA Republicans, Get in My Vagina, which she wrote and also starred in, alongside Kate Beckinsale and Judy Greer. This premiered on Real Time with Bill Maher on HBO and is one of Funny Or Die's most successful video shorts of all time.

In 2013, Andrea wrote a TV pilot for ABC/Sony produced by Jamie Tarses, as well as another pilot for Comedy Central, River Dogs, produced by Will Ferrell's Gary Sanchez Productions. She also acted opposite John Leguizamo as "Juicy" in an untitled John Leguizamo pilot for ABC.

Savage's other television credits include starring roles in the FOX pilot Rebounding and Lies & The Wives We Tell Them To on NBC. Additionally, she has recently appeared on other popular comedies such as Modern Family, House of Lies, and The League.

Savage also starred alongside Danielle Schneider, Tymberlee Hill, Angela Kinsey, Kristen Schaal, and Casey Wilson in the Hulu original series The Hotwives. The series is a parody of the reality television franchise The Real Housewives on Bravo. Season one (The Hotwives of Orlando) focused on Orlando, while season two (now titled The Hotwives of Vegas) took place in Las Vegas with the same cast playing new characters.

In 2016, she began appearing as Senator (and later President) Laura Montez on Veep, who first appears as the running mate of the titular Veep's opponent, before ultimately becoming president in a complex manipulation of constitutional procedure. That same year she also appeared in Curb Your Enthusiasm opposite Larry David.

In 2017, she created the hit semi-autobiographical TruTV comedy I'm Sorry, in which she also stars. The series premiered on July 12, 2017. Seasons 1 and 2 also aired on Netflix, and can be currently streamed on HBOMAX. She was in the middle of shooting season 3 when it was shut down for Covid. It was never allowed to finish its season.

In 2019, she launched a podcast, Andrea Savage: A Grown-Up Woman #buttholes.

In 2022, she starred as Stacy Beale, opposite Sylvester Stallone in the series Tulsa King on Paramount+, which was quickly ordered for a second season. That same year she also starred in Look Both Ways on Netflix and Beavis and Butt-Head Do the Universe for Paramount+.

Filmography

Film

Television

References

External links
 
 TheCinemaSource.com - interview with Andrea Savage
 Bio on ComedyCentral.com

1973 births
Living people
20th-century American actresses
20th-century American comedians
21st-century American actresses
21st-century American comedians
Actresses from California
American comedy writers
American film actresses
American people of Greek descent
American television actresses
American television writers
American women comedians
American women podcasters
American podcasters
American women television writers
Comedians from California
Cornell University alumni
Harvard-Westlake School alumni
Jewish American actresses
Jewish American female comedians
21st-century American Jews